A communauté de communes ("community of communes") is a federation of municipalities (communes) in France. It forms a framework within which local tasks are carried out together. It is the least-integrated form of intercommunalité (intercommunality).

As of 1 January 2007, there were 2,400 communautés de communes in France (2,391 in metropolitan France and 9 in the overseas departments), with 26.48 million people living in them. Since then, many communautés de communes have been merged or have joined a communauté d'agglomération, a communauté urbaine or a métropole. While there were 2,408 communautés de communes in January 2010 and 1,842 in January 2016, there were only 1,009 communautés de communes left on 1 April 2018. The population of the communautés de communes (2019 population data, 2022 borders) ranged from 105,383 inhabitants (Communauté de communes Le Grésivaudan, gathering the area between Grenoble and Chambéry) to 3,983 inhabitants (Communauté de communes du Causse de Labastide-Murat, Lot department).

Legal status 
The communauté de communes was created by a statute of the French Parliament enacted on 6 February 1992. The statute was modified by the Chevènement law of 1999. 

Unlike the communautés d'agglomération and the communautés urbaines, communautés de communes are not subjected to a minimum threshold of population to come into existence. The only constraint is geographical continuity.

According to the Code général des collectivités territoriales (CGCT; general law over regional administrative structures), a communauté de communes is an établissement public de coopération intercommunale (EPCI; public establishment of inter-communal cooperation) formed by several French municipalities, which cover a connected territory without enclave.

In 1999 when the Chevènement law regulatory modifications came into force, communautés de communes already in existence that did not meet the criterion of geographical continuity were left untouched.

The communes involved build a space of solidarity with a joint project of development, infrastructure building, etc.

Constitutional 
The communautés de communes are currently funded by local taxes:

 tax on housing: taxe d'habitation
 taxes on buildings and lands: taxe foncière
 tax on businesses: taxe professionnelle

The taxe professionnelle unique is a modified version of the tax whereby a proportion of the monies levied by the communautés des communes is paid back to the individual communes. The taxe professionnelle is sometimes presented as an unfair burden on the economy or even as a device for exporting jobs outside France, and it has been subject to a series of reforms over the years but central government undertakings to abolish it (and presumably to replace it) have yet to come to fruition. If they do, funding of the communautés de communes will change fundamentally.

A communauté de communes is administered by a council (conseil communautaire) made up of delegates from the municipal councils of each member commune. The number of seats allocated to each commune reflects the size of the commune. A member commune must have at least one seat on the council, and no individual commune may have more than half of the seats on the conseil communautaire.

Objectives 
Article 5214-16 of the CGCT requires the communauté de communes to exercise its responsibilities in the following policy areas:

 promotion of economic development across its entire territory
 management and maintenance of public spaces

The communauté de communes may also choose to exercise its responsibilities in at least one of the following six policy areas:

 environmental protection and enhancement
 housing and 'quality of life' policies
 highway construction, management and maintenance
 construction, maintenance and operation of buildings and other infrastructure for recreational (cultural and sports related) and educational (primary schooling and pre-schooling) purposes
 social actions for the common good
 general improvements (assainissement)

The communauté de communes may define its own personnel requirements and appoint appropriately qualified employees. In addition, and subject to départemental agreement it may exercise directly powers and responsibilities in certain social policy areas which are more normally handled at the départemental level.

Subject to these requirements, it is for the communes themselves to determine precisely which competences they will delegate to the communauté de communes:  they will do this based on their view of the individual commune's best interests. Once powers and responsibilities have been delegated to the communauté de communes, they shall be exercised collectively through the communauté de communes and may no longer be exercised independently by individual member communes.

In 2008 there were 2,393 communautés de communes in France. Of these, roughly 1,000 had been in existence for less than a year. New communautés are currently being created at a more rapid rate than in the early years. Nevertheless, there are still many rural communes that have not joined one of these groupings.

Communautés de communes with more than 60,000 inhabitants

References

External links 
 https://web.archive.org/web/20050601001354/http://www.intercommunalites.com/

 
Fifth-level administrative divisions by country